Kevin Kinney, known professionally as Kevn Kinney (born March 12, 1961), is an American vocalist and guitarist, best known as lead singer and guitarist of rock band Drivin N Cryin.

Biography
A native of Milwaukee, Wisconsin, Kinney formed Drivin N Cryin with bassist Tim Nielsen and drummer Paul Lenz after moving to Atlanta, Georgia in 1985.  Kinney and his bandmates remained a part of the Atlanta underground rock scene until the album Fly Me Courageous, and its hit-single title track, brought them to a national audience on mainstream rock radio. A prolific songwriter, collaborator and performer, Kinney has been noted for his numerous side projects throughout his career, all while keeping Drivin N Cryin an active band. As a solo artist, he recorded the 1990 folk rock album MacDougal Blues with members of R.E.M., and the 2000 album The Flower & the Knife with various members of the jam-band scene, including Warren Haynes and John Popper. Starting in 2002, he formed the project "Sun Tangled Angel Revival" (S.T.A.R.) to release Americana and roots rock music. In 2011, Kinney released an album with The Golden Palominos, a long-standing musical collaborative project headed by Anton Fier.

Partial discography
MacDougal Blues, 1990
Down Out Law, 1994
The Flower and the Knife, 2000
Main Street, 2000Broken Hearts and Auto Parts, 2002
Sun Tangled Angel Revival, 2004
Comin' Round Again, 2006 (credited to Kevn Kinney's S.T.A.R.)
Pre-Approved, Pre-Denied, 2009
A Good Country Mile, 2011 (credited to Kevn Kinney and The Golden Palominos)
Think About It, 2022

References

External links
Drivin N Cryin official website

American rock guitarists
American male guitarists
American rock singers
Living people
1961 births
Singers from Wisconsin
Musicians from Milwaukee
Place of birth missing (living people)
Guitarists from Wisconsin
20th-century American guitarists
20th-century American male musicians
Mammoth Records artists
20th-century American singers
21st-century American guitarists
21st-century American male musicians
21st-century American singers